Marc-Antoine Charpentier (1643 – 24 February 1704) was a French Baroque composer during the reign of Louis XIV. One of his most famous works is the main theme from the prelude of his Te Deum, Marche en rondeau. This theme is still used today as a fanfare during television broadcasts of the Eurovision Network, the European Broadcasting Union.

Marc-Antoine Charpentier dominated the Baroque musical scene in seventeenth century France because of the quality of his prolific output.  He mastered all genres, and his skill in writing sacred vocal music was especially hailed by his contemporaries.

He began his career by going to Italy, there he fell under the influence of Giacomo Carissimi as well as other Italian composers, perhaps Domenico Mazzocchi. He would remain marked by the Italian style and become the only one with Jean-Joseph Cassanéa de Mondonville in France to approach the oratorio. In 1670, he became a master of music (composer and singer) in the service of the Duchess of Guise.  From 1690 Charpentier composed Médée, on a piece by Corneille. It would be a determining  failure in his career of composer: he devoted himself henceforth to religious music. He became the composer of the Carmelites of Rue du Bouloir, Montmartre Abbey, Abbaye-aux-Bois and Port-Royal. In 1698, Charpentier was appointed music master for the children of the Sainte-Chapelle du Palais. After having obtained from the king Louis XIV a softening of Lully's monopoly, Molière turned to Charpentier to compose the music for the intermissions of Circe and Andromeda, as well as sung scenes for the revivals of The Forced Marriage, and finally the musical pieces of The Imaginary invalid.

He composed secular works, stage music, operas, cantatas, sonatas, symphonies, as well as sacred music, motets (large or small), oratorios, masses, psalms, Magnificats, Litanies.

At his death, Charpentier's complete works must have numbered about 800 opus numbers, but today only 28 autograph volumes remain, or more than 500 pieces that he himself took care to classify. This collection, called Mélanges, is one of the most comprehensive sets of musical autograph manuscripts of all time.

Biography
Charpentier was born in or near Paris, the son of a master scribe who had very good connections to influential families in the Parliament of Paris. Marc-Antoine received a very good education, perhaps with the help of the Jesuits, and registered for law school in Paris when he was eighteen. He withdrew after one semester. He spent "two or three years" in Rome, probably between 1667 and 1669, and studied with Giacomo Carissimi. He is also known to have been in contact with poet-musician Charles Coypeau d'Assoucy, who was composing for the French Embassy in Rome. A legend claims that Charpentier initially traveled to Rome to study painting before he was discovered by Carissimi. This story is undocumented and possibly untrue; at any rate, although his 28 volumes of autograph manuscripts reveal considerable skill at tracing the arabesques used by professional scribes, they contain not a single drawing, not even a rudimentary sketch. Regardless, he acquired a solid knowledge of contemporary Italian musical practice and brought it back to France.

Immediately on his return to France, Charpentier probably began working as house composer to Marie de Lorraine, duchesse de Guise, who was known familiarly as "Mlle de Guise." She gave him an "apartment" in the recently renovated Hôtel de Guise – strong evidence that Charpentier was not a paid domestic who slept in a small room in the vast residence, but was instead a courtier who occupied one of the new apartments in the stable wing.

For the next seventeen years, Charpentier composed a considerable quantity of vocal works for her, among them Psalm settings, hymns, motets, a Magnificat setting, a mass and a Dies Irae for the funeral of her nephew Louis Joseph, Duke of Guise, and a succession of Italianate oratorios set to non-liturgical Latin texts. (Charpentier preferred the Latin canticum to the Italian term, oratorio). Throughout the 1670s, the bulk of these works were for trios. The usual trio was two women and a singing bass, plus two treble instruments and continuo; but when performance in the chapel of a male monastic community required male voices, he would write for an haute-contre, a tenor and a bass, plus the same instruments. Then, about 1680, Mlle de Guise increased the size of the ensemble, until it included 13 performers and a singing teacher. In the pieces written from 1684 until late 1687, the names of the Guise musicians appear as marginalia in Charpentier's manuscripts – including "Charp" beside the haute-contre line. Étienne Loulié, the senior instrumentalist who played keyboard, recorder and viole, probably was entrusted with coaching the newer instrumentalists.

Despite what is often asserted, during his seventeen years in the service of Mlle de Guise, Charpentier was not the "director" of the Guise ensemble. The director was a gentleman of Mlle de Guise's court, an amateur musician, Italophile, and Latinist named Philippe Goibaut, familiarly called Monsieur Du Bois. Owing to Mlle de Guise's love for Italian music (a passion she shared with Du Bois), and her frequent entertaining of Italians passing through Paris, there was little reason for Charpentier to conceal the Italianisms he had learned in Rome.

During his years of service to Mlle de Guise, Charpentier also composed for "Mme de Guise", Louis XIV's first cousin. It was in large part owing to Mme de Guise's protection that the Guise musicians were permitted to perform Charpentier's chamber operas in defiance of the monopoly held by Jean Baptiste Lully. Most of the operas and pastorales in French, which date from 1684 to 1687, appear to have been commissioned by Mme de Guise for performance at court entertainments during the winter season; but Mlle de Guise doubtlessly included them in the entertainments she sponsored several times a week in her palatial Parisian residence.

By late 1687, Mlle de Guise was dying. Around that time, Charpentier entered the employ of the Jesuits. Indeed, he is not named in the princess's will of March 1688, nor in the papers of her estate, which is strong evidence that she had already rewarded her loyal servant and approved of his departure.

During his seventeen-odd years at the Hôtel de Guise, Charpentier had written almost as many pages of music for outside commissions as he had for Mlle de Guise. (He routinely copied these outside commissions in notebooks with Roman numerals.) For example, after Molière's falling out with Jean-Baptiste Lully in 1672, Charpentier had begun writing incidental music for the spoken theater of Molière. It probably was owing to pressure on Molière exerted by Mlle de Guise and by young Mme de Guise that the playwright took the commission for incidental music for Le Malade imaginaire away from Dassoucy and gave it to Charpentier. After Molière's death in 1673, Charpentier continued to write for the playwright's successors, Thomas Corneille and Jean Donneau de Visé. Play after play, he would compose pieces that demanded more musicians than the number authorized by Lully's monopoly over theatrical music. By 1685, the troop ceased flouting these restrictions. Their capitulation ended Charpentier's career as a composer for the spoken theater.

In 1679, Charpentier had been singled out to compose for Louis XIV's son, the Dauphin. Writing primarily for the prince's private chapel, he composed devotional pieces for a small ensemble composed of royal musicians: the two Pièche sisters singing with a bass named Frizon, and instruments played by the two Pièche brothers. In short, an ensemble that, with Mlle de Guise's permission, could perform works he had earlier composed for the Guises. By early 1683, when he was awarded a royal pension, Charpentier was being commissioned to write for court events such as the annual Corpus Christi procession. In April of that year, he became so ill that he had to withdraw from the competition for the sub-mastership of the royal chapel. Speculations that he withdrew because he knew he would not win seem disproved by his autograph notebooks: he wrote nothing at all from April through mid-August of that year, strong evidence that he was too ill to work.

From late 1687 to early 1698, Charpentier served as maître de musique (music master) to the Jesuits, working first for their collège of Louis-le-Grand (for which he wrote Celse martyr,  David et Jonathas and where he was still employed in April 1691) and then for the church of Saint-Louis adjacent to the order's professed house on the rue Saint-Antoine. Once he moved to Saint-Louis, Charpentier virtually ceased writing oratorios and instead primarily wrote musical settings of psalms and other liturgical texts such as the Litanies of Loreto. During his years at Saint-Louis, his works tended to be for large ensembles that included paid singers from the Royal Opera. In addition, during these years Charpentier succeeded Étienne Loulié as music teacher to Philippe, Duke of Chartres.

Charpentier was appointed maître de musique for the Sainte-Chapelle in Paris in 1698, a royal post he held until his death in 1704. One of his most famous compositions during his tenure was the Mass Assumpta Est Maria (H. 11). That this work survived suggests that it was written for another entity, an entity that was entitled to call upon the musicians of the Chapel and reward them for their efforts. Indeed, virtually none of Charpentier's compositions from 1690 to 1704 have survived, because when the maître de musique died, the royal administration routinely confiscated everything he had written for the Chapel. Charpentier died at Sainte-Chapelle, Paris, and was buried in the little walled-in cemetery just behind the choir of the chapel. (The cemetery no longer exists.)

In 1727, Charpentier's heirs sold his autograph manuscripts (28 folio volumes) to the Royal Library, today the Bibliothèque nationale de France. Commonly known as the Mélanges, or Meslanges, and now available as facsimiles published by Minkoff-France, these manuscripts were divided by Charpentier himself into two series of notebooks – one bearing Arabic numbers and the other Roman numbers, and each notebook numbered chronologically. These manuscripts (and their watermarks) have permitted scholars not only to date his compositions but also to determine the events for which many of these works were written.

Music, style and influence
His compositions include oratorios, masses, operas, leçons de ténèbres, motets and numerous smaller pieces that are difficult to categorize. Many of his smaller works for one or two voices and instruments resemble the Italian cantata of the time, and share most features except for the name: Charpentier calls them airs sérieux or airs à boire if they are in French, but cantata if they are in Italian.

Not only did Charpentier compose during that "transitory period" so important to the "evolution of musical language, where the modality of the ancients and the emerging tonal harmony coexisted and mutually enriched one another" (Catherine Cessac, Marc-Antoine Charpentier, 2004 edition, p. 464), but he also was a respected theoretician. In the early 1680s he was analyzing the harmony in a polychoral mass by the Roman composer Francesco Beretta (Bibliothèque nationale de France, Ms. Réserve VM1 260, fol. 55–56). About 1691 he wrote a manual to be used for the musical training of Philippe d’Orléans, duke of Chartres; and about 1693 he expanded this manual. The two versions survive as copies in the hand of Étienne Loulié, Charpentier's colleague, who called them Règles de Composition par Monsieur Charpentier and Augmentations tirées de l’original de Mr le duc de Chartres (Bibliothèque nationale de France, ms. n.a. fr. 6355, fols. 1–16). On a blank page of the Augmentations, Loulié in addition listed some of the points that Charpentier made in a treatise that Loulié called Règles de l’accompagnement de Mr Charpentier. Three theoretical works long known to scholars exist, but did not reveal much about Charpentier's evolution as a theoretician. Then, in November 2009, a fourth treatise, this time in Charpentier's own hand, was identified in the collection of the Lilly Library at Indiana University, Bloomington, U.S.A. Written during the final months of 1698 and numbered "XLI," this treatise appears to have been the forty-first in a series hitherto not imagined by Charpentier scholars, a series of theoretical treatises that spans almost two decades, from the early 1680s to 1698.

Modern significance
The prelude to his Te Deum, H.146, a rondo, is the signature tune for the European Broadcasting Union, heard in the opening credits of Eurovision events. This theme was also the intro to The Olympiad films of Bud Greenspan.

Charpentier's works 
Charpentier's compositions were catalogued by Hugh Wiley Hitchcock in his Les œuvres de Marc-Antoine Charpentier: Catalogue Raisonné, (Paris: Picard, 1982); references to works are often accompanied by their H (for Hitchcock) number. The following lists (554 H) show the entire production in each genre.

Sacred vocal works

Masses (12) 

 Messe, H.1 (? 1670) 
 Messe pour les Trépassés à 8, H.2 (? 1670) 
 Messe à 8 voix et 8 violons et flûtes, H.3 (? 1670) 
 Messe à quatre chœurs, H.4 (? 1670) 
 Messe pour le Port Royal, H.5 (? 1680) 
 Messe à 4 voix, 4 violons, 2 flûtes et 2 hautbois pour Mr Mauroy, H.6 (? 1690) 
 Messe des morts à quatre voix, H.7, H.7 a (? 1690) 
 Messe pour le samedi de Pâques à 4 voix H.8 (? 1690) 
 Messe de minuit pour Noël à 4 voix, flûtes, et violons, H.9 (?1690 )
 Messe des morts à 4 voix et symphonie, H.10 (? 1690) 
 Assumpta est Maria: Missa sex vocibus cum simphonia, H.11, H.11a (1702) 
 Messe pour plusieurs instruments au lieu des orgues, (see instrumental music)

Other liturgical works

Séquences 

 Prose des morts, H.12
 Prose pour le jour de Pâques, H.13
 Prose du Saint Sacrement, H.14 
 Stabat Mater pour des religieuses, H.15

Antiphons (37) 

 Antienne, "Regina caeli" H.16 
 Autre antienne, "Veni sponsa Christi" H.17 
 Salve Regina, H.18 
 Ave Regina coelorum, H.19 
 Sub tuum praesidium, H.20
 Alma Redemptoris mater, H.21 
 Ave Regina, H.22 
 Salve Regina à 3 voix pareilles, H.23
 Prélude pour Salve Regina à 3, H.23 a
 Salve Regina à 3 choeurs, H.24
 Antiphona in honorem Beatae Virginis, "Beata es Maria"  H.25 
 Antienne, H.26
 Salve Regina des Jésuites, H.27
 Antiphona sine organo ad Virginem, H.28
 Antiphona in honorem beate Genovefae / voce sola, H.29 
 Antienne, H.30
 Regina coeli voce sola cum (? flauti), H.31
 Antienne à la vierge à 2 dessus, "Regina caeli" H.32 
 Regina coeli par Charpentier, H.32 a 
 Troisième Regina coeli à 2 dessus, H.32 b
 33–35 cycle d'Antiennes pour les vêpres d'un confesseur non pontife:  
 Première antienne pour les vêpres d'un confesseur non pontife, H.33
 Troisième antienne pour les vêpres d'un confesseur non pontife, H.34
 Cinquième antienne pour les vêpres d'un confesseur non pontife, H.35
 36–43 Salut de la veille des Ô et les sept Ô suivant le romain:  
 Salut pour la veille des Ö, H.36
 Premier Ô, H.37
 Second Ô, H.38
 Troisième Ô, H.39
 Quatrième Ô, H.40
 Cinquième Ô, H.41
 Sixième Ô, H.42
 Septième Ô, H.43
 44–47 cycle d'Antiennes à la Vierge Marie pour l'année liturgique: 
 Antienne à la Vierge depuis les vêpres du samedi de devant le premier dimanche de l'Avant jusqu'aux complies du jour de la Purification inclusivement / Alma Redemptoris à Quatre voix et deux violons, H.44
 Antienne à la Vierge depuis le lendemain de la purification jusqu'aux vêpres du Jeudi saint exclusivement / Ave regina coelorum à quatre voix et deux dessus de violon, H.45
 Antienne à la Vierge depuis les complies du samedi saint jusqu'à none inclusivement du premier samedi d'après la Pentecôte / Regina coeli à quatre voix et deux dessus de violon, H.46
 Antienne à la Vierge depuis les vêpres de la veille de la Trinité jusqu'à none du samedi devant le premier dimanche de l'Avant/ Salve regina à quatre voix et deux violons, H.47
 Antienne à la Vierge pour toutes les saisons de l'année / Inviolata reformé, H.48
 Antienne à 3 voix pareilles pour la veille des Ô, H.49
 50–52 Antienne pour les vêpres de l'Assomption de la Vierge: 
 Après Dixit Dominus, H.50
 Pour les mêmes vêpres / Antienne après Laetatus sum, H.51
 Antienne pour les mêmes vêpres après Lauda Jerusalem Dominum, H.52

Hymnes (19) 

 Jesu corona Virginum: hymne au commun des vierges à deux dessus et une flûte, H.53 
 Hymne du Saint Esprit à trois voix pareilles avec symphonie et choeur si l'on veut, H.54 
 55–57 In Sanctum Nicasium Rothomagensem Archie piscopum et Martyrem: 
 Hymnus ad Vesperas, H.55
 Hymnus in eundem at matutinem, H.56
 In eundem ad laudes, H.57
 Pange lingua, H.58 
 Gaudia Virginis Mariae, H.59
 Hymne pour toutes les fêtes de la Vierge, H.60 
 Pour un reposoir / Pange flingua, H.61 
 Pange flingua pour des religieuses / Pour le Port Royal, H.62
 Hymne à la Vierge, "Ave maris stella" H.63 
 Hymne du Saint Sacrement, H.64
 Ave maris stella, H.65
 Hymne du Saint Esprit / Veni Creator, H.66
 Ave maris stella, H.67
 Pange lingua à 4 voix pour le Jeudi saint, H.68
 Veni Creator pour un dessus seul au catéchisme, H.69
 Veni Creator Spiritus pour un dessus seul pour le catéchisme, H.70
 Iste Confessor, H.71

Magnificat settings (10) 

 Magnificat, H.72
 Magnificat, H.73 
 Magnificat à 8 voix et 8 instruments, H.74
 Magnificat à 3 dessus, H.75
 Canticum B.V.M. H.76
 Prélude pour le premier Magnificat à 4 voix sans instruments, H.76 a
 Magnificat, H.77 
 Magnificat, H.78
 Troisième Magnificat à 4 voix avec instruments, H.79
 Magnificat, H.80
 Magnificat pour le Port Royal, H.81

Litany of Loreto settings (9) 

 Litanies de la Vierge à 3 voix pareilles, H.82
 Litanies de la Vierge à 6 voix et deux dessus de viole, H.83 
 Litanies de la Vierge à 3 voix pareilles avec instruments, H.84 
 Litanies de la Vierge, H.85
 Litanies de la Vierge à deux dessus et une basse chantante, H.86
 Litanies de la vierge à 4 voix, H.87
 Litanies de la Vierge à 4 voix, H.88
 Litanies de la Vierge, H.89
 Courtes Litanies de la Vierge à 4 voix, H.90

Tenebrae lessons and responsories (54) 

 Leçon de ténèbres, H.91 
 Autre leçon de ténèbres / Troisième du Mercredi saint, H.92 
 Autre leçon de ténèbres / 3ème du Jeudi saint, H.93 
 Autre Jerusalem pour les leçons de ténèbres à 2 voix / pour la la seconde du Jeudi saint, H.94 
 Troisième leçon du Vendredi Saint, H.95 
 96–110 Les neuf leçons de ténèbres:  
 Première leçon du Mercredi saint, H.96
 Seconde leçon du Mercredi saint, H.97
 Troisième leçon de Mercredi saint, H.98
 Lettres hébraïques de la première leçon de ténèbres du Vendredi saint, H.99
 Première lettre, H.99 a
 Seconde lettre, H.99 b
 Troisième lettre, H.99 c
 Ritournelles pour la première leçon de ténèbres du Vendredi saint, H.100 :
 Prélude devant De lamentatione pour le Jeudi et le Vendredi saint, H.100 a
 Misericordiae Domini tacet / Ritournelles après miserationes jus, H.100 b
 Les violes / Novi dilucolo tacet / Ritournelles après fides tua, H.100 c
Ritournelles pour la première leçon du vendredi, H.100 d
Ritournelles pour la première leçon du vendredi, H.100 e
Ritournelles pour la première leçon du vendredi, H.100 f
Ritournelles pour la première leçon du vendredi, H.100 g
 Prélude pour la première leçon de ténèbres du Mercredi saint, H.101
 Première leçon de ténèbres du Jeudi saint, H.102
 Seconde leçon du Jeudi Saint, H.103 
 Troisième leçon du Jeudi saint, H.104
 Première leçon du Vendredi saint, H.105
Première leçon du Vendredi saint (transposée en Sol Majeur), H.105
Seconde leçon du Vendredi saint, H.106
 Seconde leçon du Jeudi saint à voix seule, H.107
 Troisième leçon du Mercredi à trois parties, H.108
 Troisième leçon du Jeudi saint à 3 voix, H.109 
 Troisième leçon du Vendredi saint, H.110
 111–119 Les neuf répons de chaque jour / Les neuf répons du Mercredi saint: 
 Premier répons après la première leçon du premier nocturne, H.111
 Second répons après le seconde leçon du premier nocturne, H.112
 Troisième répons après la troisième leçon du premier nocturne, H.113
 Quatrième répons après la première leçon du second nocturne, H.114
 Cinquième répons après la seconde leçon du second nocturne, H.115
 Sixième répons après la troisième leçon du second nocturne, H.116
 Septième répons après la première leçon du troisième nocturne, H.117
 Huitième répons après la seconde leçon du troisième nocturne, H.118
 Neuvième répons après la troisième leçon du troisième nocturne du Mercredi saint, H.119
 120–122 Leçons de ténèbres:
Première leçon de ténèbres du Mercredi saint pour une basse, H.120
Première leçon de ténèbres du Jeudi saint pour une basse, H.121
 Première leçon de ténèbres du Vendredi saint pour une basse, H.122
 123–125 Leçons de ténèbres:
 Troisième leçon de ténèbres du Mercredi saint pour une basse taille avec 2 flûtes et deux violons, H.123
 Troisième leçon de ténèbres du Jeudi saint pour une basse taille avec 2 flûtes et 2 violons, H.124
 Troisième leçon de ténèbres du Vendredi saint pour une basse taille avec 2 flûtes et deux violons, H.125
 Second répons après la seconde leçon du premier nocturne du Mercredi saint, H.126
 Premier répons après la première leçon du second nocturne du Jeudi saint, H.127
 Second répons après la seconde leçon du premier nocturne du Jeudi saint, H.128
 Second répons après la seconde leçon du second nocturne du Jeudi Saint, H.129
 Second répons après la seconde leçon du premier nocturne de Vendredi saint, H.130
 Troisième répons après la 3ème leçon du second nocturne du Vendredi saint, H.131
 Troisième répons après la troisième leçon du second nocturne du Mercredi saint, H.132
 Premier répons après la première leçon du second nocturne du Jeudi saint, H.133
 Second répons après la seconde leçon du second nocturne du Vendredi saint, H.134
 135–137 Leçons de ténèbres: 
 Troisième leçon de ténèbres du Mercredi saint, H.135
 Troisième leçon de ténèbres du Jeudi saint, H.136
 Troisième leçon de ténèbres du Vendredi saint, H.137
 138–140 Leçons de ténèbres: 
 Seconde leçon de ténèbres du Mercredi saint, H.138
 Seconde leçon de ténèbres du Jeudi saint, H.139
 Seconde leçon de ténèbres du Vendredi saint, H.140
 141–143 Leçons de ténèbres: 
 Troisième leçon de ténèbres du Mercredi saint pour une basse, H.141
 Troisième leçon de ténèbres du Jeudi saint pour une basse, H.142
 Troisième leçon de ténèbres du Vendredi saint pour une basse, H.143
 Répons après la première leçon de ténèbres du Jeudi saint pour une haute taille et 2 flûtes, H.144

Te Deum settings (6) 

Te Deum à 8 voix  H.145 (1670)
Te Deum, H.146 (1690)
 Te Deum à 4 voix, H.147 (1690)
Te Deum à 4 voix, H.148 (1698–99)
Te Deum (lost)
Te Deum (lost)

Psalms (84) 

 Psaume 112, H.149
 Paume 126, H.150
 Confitebor à 4 voix et 2 violons, H.151
 Psaume 116, H.152
 Psaume 109, H.153
 Psaume 111, H.154
 Psaume 131, H.155
 De profundis, H.156
 Miserere à 2 dessus, 2 flûtes, et basse continue, H.157 
 Psalmus David, H.158
 Psaume 116, H.159
 Psalmus 2 us 6 us supra centisium à 4 voix "Nisi Dominus", H.160 
 Prélude pour Nisi Dominum à 4 voix sans instruments, H.160 a
 Psalmus David vigesimus primus post centesimum, H.161
 Exaudiat à 8 voix, flûtes et violons, H.162
 Psalmus David VIII, H.163
 Prière pour le Roi, H.164
 Precacio pro Rege, H.165
 Precacio pro Filio Regis, H.166
 Quam dilecta: Psalmus David octogésimus tertius, H.167
 Psalmus David 5 us (recte 2 us) in tempore belli pro Rege, H.168
 Prélude pour quatre fremuerunt ventes à 8 voix, H.168 a
 Psalmus David 125 us, H.169
 Psalmus David centesimus trigesimus sextus: Super flumina Babylonis, H.170
 Super flumina / Psalmus 136 octo vocibus cum instrumentis, H.171
 Prélude pour Super flumina, H.171 a
 Psalmus 3 us, H.172
 Miserere à deux voix, une haute-contre et basse continue, H.173
 Psaume 41, H.174
 Psaume 1, H.175
 Psaume 97, H.176
 Psaume 148, H.177
 Psalmus Davidis centisemus vigesimus septimus, H.178
 Psalmus David septuagesimus quints, H.179
 Exaudiat pour le Roi à 4, H.180 
 Premier prélude pour l'Exaudiat à 4 voix sans instruments D la re sol à 2 violons, H.180 a
 Second prélude à 4 violons pour le même Exaudiat, H.180 b
 Psalmus David octogesimus quartus, H.181
 Psalmus David centesimus sexdecimus sine organo, H.182
 Psalmus David 107, H.183
 Psalmus David, 5 us (recte 2 dus), H.184
 Psalmus David nonagesimus primus, H.185
 Psalmus David octogesimus tertius, H.186
 Psalmus 86, H.187
 Psalmus 62, H.188
 De profundis, H.189 
 Psalmus 109 us: Dixit Dominus à 8 vocibus et todidem instrumentis, H.190
 Psalmus 147, H.191
 Psaume 46, H.192
 Psalmus David 50 mus / Miserere des Jésuites, H.193 
 Prélude pour le Miserere à 6 voix et instruments, H.193 a 
 Psalmus David nonagesimus 9 nus, H.194
 Bonum est confiteri Domino / Psalmus David 91 us, H.195 
 Psalmus David 12 us, H.196
 Psalmus David 109 us, H.197 
 Prélude pour le premier Dixit Dominus en petit en G re sol bémol, H.197 a
 Psalmus David 4 us, H.198
 Psalmus David Centesimus Undecimus, "Beatus vir" H.199 
 Prélude pour le premier Beatus vir à 4 voix, H.199 a
 Psaume 110 e: "Confitebor tibi", H.200 
 Prélude pour le premier Confitebor à 4 voix sans instruments, H.200 a
 Psalmus David 34 us, H.201
 Dixit Dominus: Psalmus David 109 us, H.202
 Dixit Dominus: Psalmus David 109 / Prélude, H.202 a
 Psalmus supra centesimum duodecimus, "Laudate pueri" H.203 
 Prélude pour Laudate pueri Dominum à 4 voix sans instruments en G re sol naturel, H.203 a
 Psaume 109, H.204
 Gloria Patri pour le De profundis en C sol ut bémol à quatre voix, 4 violons et flûtes, H.205
 Psalmus David 5 us post septuagesimum, H.206
 Psalmus Davidis post octogesimum septimus, H.207
 Psalmus undecimus Davidis post centesimum: Beatus vir qui timet Dominum 4 vocibus cum symphonia, H.208
 Psalmus David 115 us, "Credidi propter" H.209 
 Prélude pour Credidi à 4 voix sans instruments en sol ut, H.209 a
 Lauda Jerusalem: Psalmus David 147 us, H.210
 Psalmus Davidis vigesimus nonus super centesimum / De profundis à quatre voix, H.211
 Psalmus David 120 us quatuor vocibus, H.212
 De profundis, H.213 
 De profundis, H.213 a
 Psalmus Davidis decimus sextus post centesimum, H.214
 Psalmus David 67 us, H.215
 Psalmus Davidis CXXI us, H.216
 Psalmus 123 us, H.217
 Psalmus David 45 us, H.218
 Miserere Psalmus 50 à 4 voix et 4 instruments, H.219
 Psalmus David 110 us à 4 voix, "Confitebor tibi Domine" H.220 
 Psalmus David 111 à 4 voix, "Beatus vir" H.221 
 Court De profundis à 4 voix, H.222
 Laudate Dominum omnes gentes octo vocibus et totidem instrumentis, H.223
 Beatus vir qui timet Dominum 8 vocibus et totidem instrumentis, H.224
 Confitebor à 4 voix et instruments, H.225
 Dixit Dominus pour le Port Royal, H.226
 Laudate Dominum omnes gentes pour le Port Royal, H.227
 Psalmus David LXX: 3e psaume (sic) du 1er nocturne du Mercredi saint, H.228
 Psalmus David 26 tus: 3e psaume (sic) du 1er nocturne du Jeudi saint, H.229
 Psalmus David 15 us: 3e psaume (sic) du 1er nocturne du Vendredi saint, H.230
 Psaume 126, H.231
 De profundis, H.232

Motets

Elevation motets (48) 

 Elévation, "Ave verum corpus" H.233 (? 1670) 
 Elévation,.H.234 (? 1670)
 O sacrum convivium à 3 dessus: Elevatio, H.235 (? 1670)
 Elévation, H.236 (? 1670)
 Elévation pour la paix, H.237 (?1670) 
 Prélude en A pour O Bone Jesu à 3 voix pareilles pour la paix, H.237 a 
 Elévation, H.238 (? 1670)
 O sacrum à trois, H.239
 O sacrum convivium de Charpentier pars, H.239 a (1670)
 O sacrum pour trois religieuses, H.240
 Elévation, H.241
 Ecce panis voce sola / Elévation, H.242 
 Panis angelicus voce sola / Elévation, H.243 
 Elévation à 2 dessus et une basse chantante, H.244
 Elévation, H.245 
 Elévation, H.246
 Elévation, H.247 
 Elévation, H 248
 Elévation, H.249 
 Elévation, H.250
 Elévation à 5 sans dessus de violon, "Transfige dulcissime Jesu" H.251 
 Elévation, H.252
 O amor: Elévation à 2 dessus et une basse chantante ou pour une haute contre, taille et basse chantante en le transposant un ton plus haut, H.253
 Prélude pour O amor à 3 violons, H.253 a
 Elévation, "O pretiosum et admirabile convivium" H.254 
 Elévation, H.255 
 Elévation à 3 dessus, H.256
 Elevation, "Gustate et videte" H.257  
 Elevation, "Nonne Deo subjecta erit" H.258 
 Elévation, H.259
 Elevation. H.260 
 O salutaris à 3 dessus, H.261
 O salutaris, H.262
 Elévation, H.263 
 Elévation au Saint Sacrement, H.264
 Elévation à 3 voix pareilles, H.264 a
 Elévation, H.265
 Elévation, H.266
 Elévation, H.267
 Elévation à voix seule pour une taille, H.268
 A l'elévation de la sainte hostie, H.269
 Pour le Saint Sacrement à 3 voix pareilles, H.270
 Pour le Saint Sacrement à 3 voix pareilles, H.271
 Elévation à 2 dessus et une basse, H.272
 Elévation, H.273
 Elévation, H.274
 Elévation, H.275
 Elévation, H.276 
 Elévation, "Cantemus Domino" H.277 
 Motet du Saint Sacrement à 4 / Charpentier, H.278
 Motet à voix seule pour une Elévation, H.279
 Motet du Saint Sacrement, H.280

"Domine salvum" motets (25) 

 Domine salvum, H.281 
 Domine salvum, H.282 
 ...Domine salvum de la messe à 8, H.283
 Domine salvum à 3 voix pareilles avec orgue, H.284 
 Domine salvum, H.285
 Domine Salvum, H.286 
 Domine salvum, H.287 
 Domine salvum pour trois religieuses, H.288
 Domine salvum, H.289 
 Domine salvum sine organo en C sol ut, H.290
 Domine salvum, H.291
 Domine salvum, H.292
 Domine salvum, H.293 
 Domine salvum, H.294 
 Domine salvum, H.295 
 Domine salvum, H.296
 Domine salvum pour un haut et un bas dessus, H.297 
 Domine salvum, H.298
 Domine salvum, H.299
 Domine salvum à 3 dessus, H.300
 Domine salvum à 3 voix pareilles, H.301
 Domine salvum à 3 voix pareilles, H.302
 Domine salvum, H.303
 Domine salvum, H.304 
 Motet, "Domine salvum fac regem" H.305

Occasional motets (85) 

 Pour St Bernard, "Gaudete fideles" H.306 
 Pour St Augustin, "O doctor optime" H.307 
 Pour Pâques, "Haec dies quam fecit" H.308 
 Nativité de la Vierge, "Sicut spina rosam" H.309 
 St François, "Jubilate Deo fideles" H.310 
 Motet pour les trépassés à 8 / Plainte des âmes du purgatoire, H.311
 O filii à 3 voix pareilles, H.312 
 Pour la conception de la Vierge, "Conceptio tua Dei genitrix" H.313 
 In nativitatem Domini canticum, H.314
 Pour Ste Anne, "Gaude felix Anna" H.315 
 In circumcisione Domini, H.316 
 Pour le jour de Ste Geneviève, H.317 
 In festo purificationis, H.318 
 Motet pour la Trinité, H.319
 Motet de St Louis, H.320
 Motet de St Laurent, H.321
 Motet de la Vierge pour toutes ses fêtes, H.322 
 In honorem santi Ludovici Regis Galliae canticum tribus vocibus cum symphonia, H.323 
 In nomine Jesu, H.324
 Canticum Annae, H.325 
 Graciarum actiones ex sacris codicibus excerptae pro restituta serenissimi Galliarum Delphini salute, H.326 
 Motet pour toutes les fêtes de la Vierge, H.327 
 Supplicacio pro defunctis ad beatam Virginem, H.328 
 Pour un reposoir, H.329 
 Gaudia beatae Virginis Mariae, H.330 
 Luctus de morte augustissimae Mariae Theresiae reginae Galliae, H.331 
 In honorem Sancti Ludovici regis Galliae, H.332
 Pro omnibus festis B.V.M. H.333 
 Motet pour la Vierge, "Alma Dei creatoris" H.334 
 335–338 Quatuor Anni Tempestates:  
 Ver, H.335
 Aestas, H.336
 Prélude pour l'été 3 flûtes, H.336 a
 Autumnus, H.337
 Hyems, H.338
 Chant joyeux de Pâques, H.339
 Ad beatam Virginem canticum, H.340 
 Gratiarum actiones pro restituta Regis christianissimi sanitate anno 1686, H.341 
 Ste Thérèse, H.342
 Magdalena lugens voce sola cum symphonia, H.343 
 Magdalena Lugens, H.343 a
 In festo corporis Christi canticum, H.344
 Canticum Zachariae, H.345 
 Pour le Saint Sacrement au reposoir, H.346
 In honorem Sti Benediti, "Exultet omnium" H.347 
 Motet du Saint Sacrement pour un reposoir, H.348 
 349–351 Pour la Passion de Notre Seigneur: 
 Première pause, "O crux ave" H.349 
 Seconde pause, "Popule meus" H.350 
 Pour le jour de la Passion de Notre Seigneur, H.351
 Second motet pour le catéchisme à la pause du milieu / à la Vierge, H.352
 In Assumptione Beatae Mariae Virginis, H.353
 Motet pour St François de Borgia, H.354
 In honorem Sancti Xaverij canticum, H.355
 Canticum de Sto Xaverio, H.355 a
 O filii pour les voix, violons, flûtes et orgue, H.356
 In purificationem B. V. M canticum, "Psallite caelites" H.357 
 In festo corporis Christi canticum, H.358
 Motet pour la Vierge à 2 voix, "Omni die hic Mariae" H.359 
 Pour la Vierge, "Felix namque es" H.360 
 Pour plusieurs martyrs / motet à voix seule sans accompagnement, H.361
 Pour le Saint Esprit, H.362
 Motet pendant la guerre, H.363
 Pour le Saint Esprit, H.364
 Pour Le Saint Esprit, H.364 a
 In honorem Sancti Ludovici regis Galliae canticum, H.365
 In honorem Sancti Ludovici regis Galliae canticum, H.365 a
 Pour le Saint Esprit, H.366
 La prière à la vierge du père Bernard, H.367
 Motet de St Joseph, H.368
 Pro virginie non martyre, H.369
 Pour le catéchisme, "Gloria in excelsis Deo" H.370 
 A la Vierge à 4 voix pareilles, H.371
 Pour la seconde fois que le Saint Sacrement vient au même reposoir, H.372
 Pour Marie Madeleine, "Sola vivebat in antris" H.373 
 Pour Ste Thérèse, "Flores o Gallia" H.374 
 Pour un confesseur non pontife, "Euge serve bone" H.375 
 Pour un confesseur, H.376
 Pour tous les saints, H.377
 Pour le Carême, H.378
 Pour plusieurs fêtes, H.379
 380–389 Méditations pour le Carême:  
 Première méditation, H.380
 Deuxième méditation, H.381
 Troisième méditation, H.382
 Quatrième méditation, H.383
 Cinquième méditation, H.384
 Sixième méditation, H.385
 Septième méditation, H.386
 Huitième méditation, H.387
 Neuvième méditation: Magdalena lugens, H.388
 Dixième méditation, H.389
 Motet de la Vierge à 4, H.390

Dramatic motets (oratorios) (34) 

 Judith sive Bethulia liberata, H.391 (1675) 
 Canticum pro pace, H.392 (1675–76) 
 Canticum in nativitatem, H.393 (1675–76)
 In honorem Caelia, Valeriani et Tiburtij canticum, H.394 (1676)
 Pour la fête de l'Epiphanie, H.395 (1677)
 Historia Esther, H.396 (1677) 
 Caecilia virgo et martyr octo vocibus, H.397 (1683–85)
 Pestis Mediolanensis, H.398 (1679)
 Prélude pour Horrenda pestis, H.398 a (1680–83)
 Filius prodigus, H.399 (1680) 
 Prélude pour l'Enfant prodigue, H.399 a (1680–83)
 Canticum in honorem Beatae Virginis Mariae inter homines et angelos... H.400 (1680)
 Extremum Dei judicium, H.401 (Jugement dernier) (1680) 
 Sacrificium Abrahae, H.402 (1681–83/92) 
 Symphonies ajustées au sacrifice d'Abraham, H.402 a (1680–83)
 Mors Saülis et Jonathae, H.403 (1681–82) 
 Josue, H.404 (1681–82) 
 Prélude, H.404 a (fin 1680–83)
 In resurrectione Domini Nostri Jesu Christi, H.405 (1682)
 In circumcisione Domini / Dialogus inter angelum et pastores, H.406 (fin 1683)
 Dialogus inter esurientem et Christum, H.407 (1682–83)
 Elévation, H.408 (fin 1683)
 In obitum augustissimae nec non piissimae Gallorum regina lamentum, H.409 (1683) 
 Praelium Michaelis Archangeli factum in coelo cum dracone, H.410 (fin 1683)
 Caedes sanctorum innocentium, H.411 (1683–84) 
 Nuptiae sacrae, H.412 (1684) 
 Caecilia virgo et martyr, H.413 (1684) 
 In nativitatem Domini Nostri Jesu Christi canticum, H.414 (1684) 
 Caecilia virgo et martyr, H.415 (1685) 
 Prologue de la Ste Cécile, H.415 a (1686) 
 In nativitatem Domini canticum, H.416 (1690)
 Dialogus inter Christum et homines, H.417 (1692)
 In honorem Sancti Ludovici regis Galliae, H.418 (1692–93)
 Pour St Augustin mourant, H.419 (1687)
 Dialogus inter angelos et pastores Judeae, H.420 (1687) 
 In nativitatem Domini Nostri Jesu Christi canticum, H.421 (1698)
 Judicium Salomonis, H.422 (1702)
 Dialogus inter Magdalena et Jesum 2 vocibus Canto et Alto cum organo, H.423 (?)
 Le Reniement de St Pierre, H.424 (?) 
 Dialogus inter Christum et peccatores, H.425 (?)
 Prélude pour Mementote peccatores, H.425 a (1685–86)

Miscellaneous motets (14) 

 "Quae est ista", H.426 
 Pie Jesu, H.427 
 (no name), H.428, H.429, H.430
 Gratitudinis erga Deum canticum, H.431 
 Offertoire pour le sacre d'un évêque à 4 parties de voix et d'instruments, H 432
 Domine non secundum pour une basse taille avec 2 violons, H.433
 Motet pour une longue offrande / Motet pour l'offertoire de la Messe Rouge, H.434
 (no name), H.435, H.436, H.437, H.438
 Bone Pastor, H.439

Secular vocal works

Airs sérieux et à boire  

 "A ta haute valeur", H.440
 "Ah! laissez moi rêver", H.441
 "Ah! qu'ils sont courts les beaux jours", H.442
 "Ah! qu'on est malheureux d'avoir eu des désirs", H.443
 "Au bord d'une fontaine", H.443 bis
 "Allons sous ce vert feuillage", H.444
 "Amour vous avez beau redoubler mes alarmes", H.445
 "Auprès du feu l'on fait l'amour", H.446
 "Ayant bu du vin clairet", H.447
 "Beaux petits yeux d'écarlate", H.448
 "Brillantes fleurs naissez", H.449 (Jean de La Fontaine)
 "Feuillages verts naissez", H.449 a
 "Charmantes fleurs naissez", H.449 b
 "Printemps, vous renaissez", H.449 c
 "Aimables fleurs naissez", H.449 d
 "Climène sur ses bords", H.449 e
 "Celle qui fait tout mon tourment", H.450
 "Consolez vous, chers enfants de Bacchus", H.451
 "En vain rivaux assidus", H.452
 "Faites trêve à vos chansonnettes", H.453
 "Fenchon, la gentille Fenchon", H.454
 "Il faut aimer, c'est un mal nécessaire", H.454 bis
 "Non, non je ne l'aime plus", H.455
 "Oiseaux de ces bocages", H.456
 457–459 Airs sur les stances du Cid, (Pierre Corneille):
 "Percé jusqu'au fond du coeur", H.457
 "Père, maitresse, honneur, amour", H.458
 "Que je sens de rudes combats", H.459
 "Que Louis par sa vaillance", H.459 bis
 "Qu'il est doux, charmante Climène", H.460
 "Deux beaux yeux un teint de jaunisse", H.460 a
 "Le beau jour dit une bergère", H.460 b
 "Un flambeau, Jeannette, Isabelle", H.460 c (Emile Blamont)
 "Quoi je ne verrai plus", H.461
 "Quoi rien ne peut vous arrêter?", H.462
 "Rendez moi mes plaisirs", H.463
 "Rentrez, trop indiscrets soupirs", H.464
 "Retirons nous, fuyons", H.465
 "Ruisseau qui nourrit dans ce bois", H.466
 "Sans frayeur dans ce bois", H.467
 "Tout renait, tout fleurit", H.468
 "Tristes déserts, sombre retraite", H.469
 "Veux tu, compère Grégoire", H.470
 "Si Claudine ma voisine", H.499 b
 Airs italiens et français, (lost)

Cantatas (Italian, French and Latin) 

 Orphée descendant aux enfers, H.471
 Serenata a tre voci e sinfonia, H.472
 Epithalamio in lode dell'Altezza serenissima Elettorale di Massimiliano Emanuel Duca di Baviera concento a cinque voci con stromenti, H.473
 Epitaphium Carpentarii, H.474
 Beate mie pene / Duo à doi canti del Signor Charpentier, H.475
 "Superbo amore", H.476
 "Il mondo cosi va", H.477
 Cantate française de M. Charpentier, H.478
 Le roi d'Assyrie mourant, (lost)

Theatrical works

Pastorales, divertissements and operas 

 Petite pastorale, H.479 (= Jugement de Pan)
 Les Plaisirs de Versailles, H.480
 Actéon, Pastorale en musique, H.481
 Actéon changé en biche, H.481 a
 Sur la naissance de Notre Seigneur Jésus Christ: Pastorale, H.482
 Pastorale sur la naissance de notre Seigneur Jésus Christ, H.483
 Seconde partie du noël français qui commence par "que nos soupirs", H.483 a
 Seconde partie du noël français qui commence par "que nos soupirs, Seigneur", H.483 b
 Il faut rire et chanter: dispute de bergers, H.484
 La Fête de Rueil, H.485
 La Fête de Rueil, H.485 a
 La Couronne de fleurs , Pastorale, H.486 (1685)
 Les Arts florissants, Opéra, H.487 
 Les Arts florissants, H.487 a
 La Descente d'Orphée aux enfers, H.488
 Idyle sur le retour de la santé du Roi, H.489
 Celse Martyr, tragédie en musique ( P. Bretonneau), (lost)
 David et Jonathas, H.490 (P. Bretonneau)
 Ouverture de Mr Charpentier, H.490 a
 Médée, H.491 (Thomas Corneille)
 Parodie de deux airs de Médée, H.491 a
 Parodie de deux airs de Médée, H.491 b
 Parodie de deux airs de Médée, H.491 c
 492–493 Pastorelette del Sgr M. Ant. Charpentier
 Amor vince ogni cosa / Pastoraletta 1a del Sigr Charpentier, H.492
 Pastoraletta italiana IIa del Sigr Charpentier, H.493
 Philomèle, (lost, composed in collaboration with Monseigneur le Duc d'Orléans, Duc de Chartres)
 Jugement de Pan, (= Petite pastorale H.479) 
 Le Retour du Printemps, (lost)
 Artaxerse, (lost)
 La Dori e Orente, (lost)
Les Amours d'Acis et Galatée (lost) (Jean de La Fontaine)

Intermèdes and incidental music 

 Psyché, (Pierre Corneille , Molière, Quinault) 1684 (lost)
Le médecin malgré lui, (Molière) (→ H.460, 460 a, 460 b, 460 c)
Les fâcheux, (Molière) (lost)
Le Dépit amoureux, Ouverture (Molière) 1679 (lost) 
La Contesse d'Escarbagnas (Molière) H.494i 
Le Mariage forcé, H.494 (Molière) H.494ii 
 Le malade imaginaire, première version, H.495 (Molière) 
 Le malade imaginaire, seconde version, H.495 a
 Le malade imaginaire, troisième version, H.495 b
 Profitez du printemps, H.495 c
 Circé, H.496 (Thomas Corneille & Donneau de Visé) (1675)
 Parodie de 2 airs de Circé, H.496 a
 Parodie de 8 airs de Circé, H.496 b
 Parodie de 8 airs de Circé, H.496 c
 L'inconnu (Donneau de Visé & Thomas Corneille), (lost) (1675)
 Le triomphe des dames (Thomas Corneille), (lost) (1676)
 Sérénade pour le sicilien, H.497 (Molière) 
 Ouverture du prologue de Polieucte pour le Collège d'Harcourt, H.498 (Pierre Corneille)
L'Inconnu, H.499 (Donneau de Visé)
 Acis et Galatée, (H.499) (Jean de La Fontaine) (incomplete) (lost)
 Le Bavolet, H.499 a
 Les Fous divertissants, H.500 (Raymond Poisson)
 La Pierre philosophale, H.501 (Thomas Corneille & Donneau de Visé) (1681)
 Endimion, H.502
 Air pour des paysans dans la Noce de village au lieu de l'air du marié, H.503 (Brécourt)
 Andromède, H.504 (Pierre Corneille) (1682)
 Le rendez vous des Tuileries, H.505 (Baron)
 Dialogue d'Angélique et de Médor, H.506 (Dancourt)
 Vénus et Adonis, H.507 (Donneau de Visé)
 Apothéose de Laodamus à la mémoire de M. le Maréchal duc de Luxembourg, (P. de Longuemare) (lost)

Instrumental works

Sacred (32) 

 Symphonies pour un reposoir, H.508 
 Symphonie devant Regina coeli, H.509 
 (untitled) (préludes  ?), H.510 , H.512 
 Prélude pour O filii et filiae, H.511 
 Messe pour plusieurs instruments au lieu des orgues, H.513 
 Offerte pour l'orgue et pour les violons, flûtes et hautbois, H.514 
 Symphonies pour un reposoir, H.515 
 Après Confitebor: antienne en D la re sol bécarre, H.516 
 Après Beati omnes: antienne en G re sol bécarre, H.517 
 Pour le sacre d'un évêque, H.518 
 Symphonies pour le Jugement de Salomon, H.519 
 Prélude, menuet et passe-pied pour les flûtes et hautbois devant l'ouverture, H.520 
 Prélude pour ce que l'on voudra non encore employé, H.521 
 Offerte non encore exécutée, H.522 
 Pour un reposoir: Ouverture dès que la procession parait, H.523 
 Ouverture pour l'église, H.524 
 Antienne, H.525 
 Antienne, H.526 
 Prélude pour Sub tuum praesidium à trois violons, H.527 
 Prélude en G re sol bemol à 4 pour les violons et flûtes, H.528 
 Symphonie en G re sol bemol à 3 flûtes ou violons, H.529 
 Prélude en C sol ut bécarre à quatre parties de violons avec flûtes, H.530 
 Noël pour les instruments, H.531 
 Antienne pour les violons, flûtes et hautbois à quatre parties, H.532 
 Prélude pour le second Magnificat à 4 voix sans instruments en D la re bécarre, H.533 
 Noël sur les instruments, H.534 
 Prélude pour le Domine salvum en F ut fa à 4 voix, H.535 
 Ouverture pour le sacre d'un évêque, H.536 
 Ouverture pour le sacre d'un évêque pour les violons, flûtes et hautbois, H.537 
 Prélude pour..., H.538 
 Prélude pour le second Dixit Dominus à 4 voix sans instruments en F ut fa, H.539

Secular 

 Ouverture pour quelque belle entreprise à cinq, H.540 
 Deux menuets, H.541 
 Caprice pour trois violons, H.542 
 Pièces de viole, H.543 
(untitled) H.544
 Concert pour quatre parties de violes, H.545 
 Commencement d'ouverture pour ce que l'on voudra, en la rectifiant un peu, H.546 
 Deux airs de trompette, H.547 
 Sonate pour 2 flûtes allemandes, 2 dessus de violon, une basse de viole, une basse de violon à 5 cordes, un clavecin et un théorbe, H.548 
 Trio de Mr Charpentier, H.548 bis 
 Menuet de Mr Charpentier & Menuet en suite, H.548 ter 
 Menuet de Strasbourg, H.549 bis
 Symphonies... de Charpentier... (Collection Philidor vol. XXV), (lost)

Writings 
 Remarques sur les messes à 16 parties d'Italie, H.549
 Règles de composition par Mr Charpentier, H.550
 Abrégé des règles de l'accompagnement de Mr Charpentier, H.551

Tributes 
The asteroid discovered in May 1997 by Paul G. Comba at the Prescott Observatory in Arizona (USA) has been called 9445 Charpentier (1997 JA8) by NASA.

Thierry Pécou : Le Tombeau de Marc-Antoine Charpentier, pour 3 chœurs à voix égales, orgue baroque, basse de viole, positif et cloches (1995)

Philippe Hersant : Le Cantique des 3 enfants dans la fournaise (1995), poem by Antoine Godeau, in front of La Messe à 4 Choeurs H.4 by Marc-Antoine Charpentier with same chorus and orchestra. (CD Radio France 2019)

References

Bibliography

Biography
 Saint-Saëns, Camille, Au courant de la vie , Un contemporain de Lully, chapitre 1, édition Dorbon-Ainé 1914, report édition Wentworth Press, Scholar sélect 2018.
 Crussard, Claude (1893–1947), Un musicien français oublié, Marc-Antoine Charpentier, 1634–1704, Paris, Librairie Floury, 1945.
 Lowe, Robert W, Marc-Antoine Charpentier et l'opéra de collège, Paris, G.-P. Maisonneuve et Larose, 1966, 195 p.
Cessac, Catherine. Marc-Antoine Charpentier. Translated from the French ed. (Paris 1988) by E. Thomas Glasow. Portland (Oregon): Amadeus Press, 1995.
Cessac, Catherine, ed., Marc-Antoine Charpentier, un musicien retrouvé (Sprimont: Mardaga, 2005), a collection of pioneering works originally disseminated in the Bulletin Charpentier, 1989–2003. The bulk of the articles deal with his life and works: his family and its origins, Italy and Italianism at the Hôtel de Guise, his work for the Jesuits, the sale of his manuscripts, plus background information about specific works.
Cessac, Catherine, ed., Les Manuscrits autographes de Marc-Antoine Charpentier (Wavre: Mardaga, n.d.), papers presented at the conference held at Versailles, 2004. The articles in this volume focus primarily on what scholars can deduce from the 28 autograph volumes that contain his compositions.
Ranum, Patricia M. "A Sweet Servitude: A musician's life at the court of Mlle de Guise," Early Music, 15 (1987), pp. 347–60.
Ranum, Patricia M. "Lully Plays Deaf: Rereading the Evidence on his Privilege," in John Hajdu Heyer, ed., Lully Studies (Cambridge, UK: Cambridge University Press, 2000), pp. 15–31, which focuses on Charpentier's powerful contacts.

Music history and theory

External links

Charpentier, musicien du Baroque, a site in memory of the 300th anniversary of the composer's death
Te Deum's Prelude in houndbite.com
John Powell, editions (accompanied by discussions) of some of Charpentier's works
 Free scores at the Mutopia Project
  (edited by Shirley Thompson; Ashgate Publishing, 2010)
 

1643 births
1704 deaths
Catholic liturgical composers
Classical composers of church music
French ballet composers
French Baroque composers
French composers of sacred music
French male classical composers
French opera composers
Male opera composers
Oratorio composers
Lycée Louis-le-Grand teachers
17th-century male musicians